Etiology, Concept and Prophylaxis of Childbed Fever is a medical book by Ignaz Semmelweis, published in 1861. It includes studies in hospitals conducted in Vienna in 1847, dealing largely with the field of obstetrics. It was translated into English by Kay Codell Carter in 1983. The book explains how his research shows that hand hygiene in hospitals can prevent unnecessary deaths.

References
New York Times
Google books

Medical books
1840s books
Austrian literature
Hungarian literature
Obstetrics
Ignaz Semmelweis